This list of fictional rodents in comics is subsidiary to list of fictional rodents and covers all rodents appearing in graphic novelizations, manga, comic books and strips. The characters listed here include beavers, chipmunks, gophers, guinea pigs, marmots, prairie dogs, and porcupines plus the extinct prehistoric species (such as Rugosodon).

Mice & rats

Squirrels & chipmunks, & groundhogs

Others

References

Rodents
Fictional rodents